Brownson Island is located on the west side of Ernest Sound in the U.S. state of Alaska. It is separated from Etolin Island by the narrow Canoe Passage, which is navigable only for boats. A number of small islands are southward of Brownson Island. Several rocks are viewable at low water south of the southern end of Brownson Island.

References

Bibliography

Islands of the Alexander Archipelago
Islands of Wrangell, Alaska
Islands of Alaska